The Married Women's Property Act 1893 was an Act of the Parliament of the United Kingdom that significantly altered English law regarding the property rights granted to married women. It completed the Married Women's Property Act 1882 by granting married women the same property rights equal to unmarried women.

See also
Feme covert
Married Women's Property Act 1884
Primogeniture

References
 

United Kingdom Acts of Parliament 1893
Women's rights legislation
Property law of the United Kingdom
Women's rights in the United Kingdom
1893 in women's history